"Pana-vision" is the fourth single by the English rock band the Smile, released on 3 April 2022. It is included on their debut album, A Light for Attracting Attention.

Music video 
An animated visualizer directed by Sabrina Nichols, using imagery by the Radiohead artist Stanley Donwood, was released alongside on 3 April 2022. Mxdwn.com writer Lauren Floyd called the video "cinematic", saying it features "dramatically elongated and drawn out shapes and figures ... parallel to Yorke's airy falsetto".

On July 20, 2022, the scene from the series finale of the British television series Peaky Blinders that used "Pana-vision" in full three months earlier was uploaded as a separate live-action music video for the song. The music video was directed by series director Anthony Byrne.

Reception
"Pana-vision" received favourable reviews. Tyler Golsen of Far Out Magazine gave it 7.2 out of 10, calling it the Smile's most "nebulous track" so far, and likened it to Jonny Greenwood's film scores. Loudwire said its "cinematic" title fit its "picturesque piano-driven exploration". The Uproxx writer Adrian Spinelli called the song "decidedly sinister" and said the piano "challenges your mind to understand how the song is supposed to make you feel". Cleber Facchi of Música Instântanea compared the song favourably to Radiohead's 2016 album A Moon Shaped Pool.

Use in media
"Pana-vision" was used in the Peaky Blinders episode "Lock and Key", which served as the series finale. The episode also featured "That's How Horses Are", a solo song by Yorke.

Track listing
The song, on specific streaming services and digital storefronts, also contains the three previously released singles from the band:

Personnel
Credits adapted from album liner notes.

The Smile
Thom Yorke - vocals, piano
Jonny Greenwood - bass
Tom Skinner - drums

Production 
Nigel Godrich

Additional musicians
 London Contemporary Orchestra
 Hugh Brunt – orchestration
 Eloisa-Fleur Thom – violin
 Alessandro Ruisi – violin
 Zara Benyounes – violin
 Sophie Mather – violin
 Agata Daraskaite – violin
 Charlotte Bonneton – violin
 Zoe Matthews – viola
 Clifton Harrison – viola
 Oliver Coates – cello
 Max Ruisi – cello
 Clare O’Connell – cello
 Jason Yarde – saxophone
 Robert Stillman – saxophone
 Chelsea Carmichael – flute
 Nathaniel Cross – trombone
 Byron Wallen – trumpet
 Theon Cross – tuba
 Tom Herbert – double bass
 Dave Brown – double bass

References

2022 songs
Songs written by Jonny Greenwood
Songs written by Thom Yorke
Song recordings produced by Nigel Godrich
The Smile songs